Billy Smith (31 July 1894 – 28 August 1953) was an  Australian rules footballer who played with North Melbourne in the Victorian Football League (VFL).

Notes

External links 

1894 births
1953 deaths
Australian rules footballers from Victoria (Australia)
North Melbourne Football Club players